This is a list of significant earthquakes recorded in Australia and its territories. The currency used is the Australian dollar (A$) unless noted otherwise.

List of earthquakes

Other earthquakes
Broome, 16 August 1929, magnitude 6.6, offshore earthquake to the north-west of Broome, Western Australia.
Simpson Desert, 21 December 1937, magnitude 6.0, in a remote location of the Simpson Desert in the Northern Territory, south-east of Alice Springs.
Simpson Desert, 27 June 1941, magnitude 6.5, in a remote location of the Simpson Desert in the Northern Territory, south-east of Alice Springs.
Broome, 14 July 2019, magnitude 6.6, offshore earthquake 200 km north-west of Broome, Western Australia, which caused minor damage in the town itself

See also

Earthquakes in Western Australia
Geology of Australia

References

Sources

External links
 Seismicity in Australia
 The 2012 Australian Earthquake Hazard Map – Geoscience Australia

earthquakes
Australia
earthquakes